Aliani is a surname. Notable people with the surname include:

 Fazila Aliani (born 1945), Pakistani politician and activist
 Francesco Aliani (1762–1812), Italian cellist

See also
 Alians, Bulgarian Shi'a order